Robert Majzels (born May 12, 1950) is a Canadian novelist, poet, playwright and translator.

Life 

Majzels was born in Montreal, Quebec. In 1986, he graduated with a master's degree in English Literature from Concordia University in Montreal, where he would later teach creative writing for thirteen years. Between 2000 and 2002, he lived in Beijing, China and studied Chinese. After teaching for seven years at the University of Calgary, he now lives in Sooke, British Columbia.

Works 

Majzels is strongly influenced by critical and literary theory. His works explore both the limits of language and narrative forms and their ethical repercussions. His novels highlight the artificiality of Western literary language, especially its linearity, archetypal narratives, and the ways in which it works to establish characters as believable personae (characterization). Concurrently, they explore other, neglected forms of literary expression. For example, Apikoros Sleuth experimented with a Talmudic form, noted for its polyphonic, discursive, and digressive qualities.

Awards 
2000 Governor General's Award for French to English translation for Just Fine, from the French Pas Pire, by France Daigle (2000).
2008 Griffin Poetry Prize shortlist for Notebook of Roses and Civilization, from the French Cahier de roses & de civilisation, by Nicole Brossard (2007).
2008 Governor General's Award for French to English translation nomination with Erín Moure for Notebook of Roses and Civilization, from the French Cahier de roses & de civilisation, by Nicole Brossard (2007).
2014 Best Translated Book Award, Poetry, shortlist for White Piano by Nicole Brossard, from the French.
1994 Canadian Jewish Playwriting Competition, first prize for This Night the Kapo.
1991 Dorothy Silver Award, Playwrights competition, first prize for This Night the Kapo.

Partial bibliography 

Novels
 1992: Hellman's Scrapbook  a novel. Cormorant Books 
 1998: City of Forgetting  a novel. Mercury Press 
 2004: Apikoros Sleuth  a novel. Mercury Press 
 2007: The Humbugs Diet  a novel. Mercury Press 
 2020: kHarLaMoV's aNkLe: A Utopian Fantasy. The Elephants 
Plays
 2005: This Night the Kapo.  Playwrights Canada Press 
Translations
 1999: A Fine Passage  a novel, translated from the French Un fin passage by France Daigle. Anansi 
 2000: Installations  poetry translated with Erín Moure from the French Installations by Nicole Brossard.  Muses' Co. 
 2002: Museum of Bone and Water  poetry, translated with Erín Moure from the French Musée de l'os et de l'eau by Nicole Brossard. Anansi 
 2004: Life's Little Difficulties  a novel, translated from the French Petites difficultés d'existence by France Daigle. 
 2013: For Sure  translated from the French Pour sûr by France Daigle. Anansi

References

External links 

1950 births
Living people
Canadian male dramatists and playwrights
Canadian male non-fiction writers
Canadian male novelists
Canadian male poets
People from the Capital Regional District
Writers from Montreal
Writers from British Columbia
Concordia University alumni
Governor General's Award-winning translators
Academic staff of the University of Calgary
20th-century Canadian poets
20th-century Canadian male writers
20th-century Canadian translators
20th-century Canadian novelists
21st-century Canadian novelists
21st-century Canadian translators
21st-century Canadian dramatists and playwrights
21st-century Canadian male writers